Yuri Antonovich Zubakov (27 November 1943 – 18 October 2022) was a Russian diplomat and politician. He led the Apparatus of the Government of Russia from 1998 to 1999 and was Russia's ambassador to Lithuania from 1999 to 2003 and to Moldova from 2003 to 2004.

Zubakov died on 18 October 2022, at the age of 78.

References

1943 births
2022 deaths
20th-century diplomats
21st-century diplomats
People from Chita, Zabaykalsky Krai
1st class Active State Councillors of the Russian Federation
Foreign Intelligence Service (Russia) officers
Recipients of the Order of Military Merit (Russia)
Recipients of the Order of the Red Star
Russian diplomats
Ambassador Extraordinary and Plenipotentiary (Russian Federation)
Ambassadors of Russia to Lithuania
Ambassadors of Russia to Moldova